Daniel David Moses (February 18, 1952 - July 13, 2020) was a First Nations poet and playwright from Canada.

Moses was born in Ohsweken, Ontario, and raised on a farm on the Six Nations of the Grand River near Brantford, Ontario, Canada. In 2003, Moses joined the department of drama at Queen's University as an assistant professor. In 2019, he was appointed Professor Emeritus by Queen's University, Kingston, Canada.

He has worked as an independent artist since 1979 as a poet, playwright, dramaturge, editor, essayist, teacher, and writer-in-residence with institutions as varied as Theatre Passe Muraille, the Banff Centre for the Arts, Theatre Kingston, the University of British Columbia, the University of Western Ontario, the University of Windsor, the University of Toronto, the Sage Hill Writing Experience, McMaster University and Concordia University.

He was openly gay, and also claimed "brothers and sisters among Two-Spirit people." Some of his works, therefore, reflect upon and explore the complexities of Native Two-Spirit or Queer identities.

Education
Daniel David Moses has an Honours Bachelor of Arts from York University and a Masters in Fine Arts from the University of British Columbia.

Career and accomplishments
In 1974 Moses had his first poem published, and considered himself to be an independent, Toronto-based artist and poet by 1979. However, he soon added the following titles to his repertoire: playwright, dramaturge, editor, essayist, teacher, and artist-, playwright- or writer-in-residence with various institutions (Theatre Passe Muraille, the Banff Centre for the Arts, the University of British Columbia, the University of Western Ontario, the University of Windsor, the University of Toronto (Scarborough), the Sage Hill Writing Experience, McMaster University and Concordia University).

He has also "...served on the boards of the Association for Native Development in the Performing and Visual Arts, Native Earth Performing Arts and the Playwrights Union of Canada (now the Playwrights Guild of Canada) and co-founded (with Lenore Keeshig-Tobias and Tomson Highway) the short-lived but influential Committee to Re-Establish the Trickster. In 2003, he was appointed as a Queen's National Scholar to the Department of Drama at Queen's University in Kingston, Ontario where he was an associate professor."

Works
Delicate Bodies – 1980
The White Line – 1988
Coyote City: A Play in Two Acts – 1990 (nominated for a Governor General's Award)
The Dreaming Beauty – 1990 – (won 1990 Theatre Canada's National Playwrighting Competition)
Almighty Voice and His Wife – 1992
The Moon and Dead Indians – 1994 – (won 1994 Du Maurier One Act Playwrighting Competition)
The Indian Medicine Shows – 1996 – (won 1996 James Buller Award for Aboriginal Theatre Excellence – Playwright of the Year)
Big Buck City - 1998
Hotel Centrale, Rotterdam' '-2000Brébeuf's Ghost – 2000Sixteen Jesuses – 2000City of Shadows: Necropolite! – 2000Songs of Love and Medicine – 2005Pursued by a Bear: Talks, Monologues and Tales – 2005Kyotopolis – 2008River Range: Poems – 2009
Moses' poems have been published in international and national literary magazines, such as:
 Prism International 
 ARC
 Atlanta Review
 The Fiddlehead 
 Poetry Canada Review 
 Impulse Magazine 
 Prairie Fire 
 QUARRY
 Exile, the Literary Quarterly

His poetry has also appeared or been featured in the following collections:
 Native Poetry in Canada, A Contemporary Anthology, edited by Jeanette C. Armstrong and Lally Grauer
 Native Writers and Canadian Writing, edited by W.H. New
 The Last Blewointment Anthology, Volume II, edited by Bill Bissett
 First People, First Voices, edited by Penny Petrone.

Moses was a co-editor of An Anthology of Canadian Native Literature in English'' with Terry Goldie.

References

External links
 Daniel David Moses
 

20th-century Canadian dramatists and playwrights
21st-century Canadian dramatists and playwrights
20th-century Canadian poets
Canadian male poets
21st-century Canadian poets
First Nations dramatists and playwrights
Canadian gay writers
Lenape people
1952 births
2020 deaths
University of Toronto people
Harbourfront Festival Prize winners
University of British Columbia alumni
LGBT First Nations people
Canadian LGBT dramatists and playwrights
Canadian LGBT poets
Canadian male dramatists and playwrights
First Nations poets
20th-century Canadian male writers
21st-century Canadian male writers
20th-century First Nations writers
21st-century First Nations writers
Canadian artistic directors
21st-century Canadian LGBT people
Gay poets
Gay dramatists and playwrights